A. sylvestris may refer to:

 Aerisilvaea sylvestris, a plant species endemic to Tanzania
 Agathaumas sylvestris, a large ceratopsid species that lived in Wyoming during the Late Cretaceous
 Anemone sylvestris, a herbaceous perennial flowering plant species found in dry deciduous woodlands of Central and Western Europe
 Angelica sylvestris, the wild angelica, a plant species
 Anthriscus sylvestris, the cow parsley, wild chervil, wild beaked parsley or keck, a herbaceous biennial plant species
 Adenodus sylvestris, a synonym for Elaeocarpus sylvestris, a tree species found in China, Japan, Korea and Vietnam

See also 
 Sylvestris (disambiguation)